The 2017 SprintX GT Championship Series was the second season of the SprintX GT Championship Series. Dion von Moltke was the defending champion in the highest class, the Pro class in GT. It was the first season sanctioned by the United States Auto Club, after being under Sports Car Club of America sanctioning last year.

Schedule

The calendar was revealed on 13 October 2016. The season comprised five rounds, all of which are headliners. Laguna Seca did not return on the schedule. Virginia, Lime Rock and Circuit of the Americas made their first appearance on the SprintX schedule.

Entry list

GT

GT Cup

GTS

Race results

Championship standings

Drivers' championships
Championship points were awarded for the first twenty positions in each race. The overall pole-sitter also received one point. Entries were required to complete 50% of the winning car's race distance in order to be classified and earn points.

Overall

Pro-Am

Am-Am

Notes

References

GT World Challenge America
SprintX GT Championship Series